Gary Llama (born Gary Longest, June 5, 1979) is an American musician and recording engineer from Richmond, Virginia. He started playing music in the 1990s Richmond punk rock community with the band 500$Fine. In the early 2000s, he began recording solo work under various aliases and releasing them on his label, OVOLR! / Debackle.

As an author, he has written books and zines, generally with a political undertone.

In the 2000s, he worked as recording engineer and mastering engineer working with bands such as Down to Nothing and Dave Brockie Experience

He has also worked as an activist regarding the treatment by police of those with mental health concerns.

In 2016, he formed the group Mineral Writes with rapper Timbo King.

Discography

as Gary Llama
V / V (2013)
A Conversational Style Of Living (2013)
New Folk (2014)
All The Punk Rockers (2014)
A Long Road Ahead (2014)
We Always Resisted (2014)
Just Feel (2015)
A Catalog Of Around Me (2015)
The Beauty Of Music (2016)

as Imagination Society
Folded Flag Remix (2014)
Imagination Society (2014)
A Song of Possibilities (2014)
Bearbao (2014)
Here, Before (2014)
Misi (2014)
III (UNTITLED) (2014)
the rev and the bell (2014)
System (2015)
System II (2015)
Firecracker (2015)
Fifth (2015)
WTF Remix with Ben FM (2016)
Ben FM God Is A Woman (2016)

as Cinema Society
An Introduction (2010)
Small Music (2011)
Fortress (2012)
SAVE (2012)

as Fbox
ep1020 (2001)
Hateless (2003)
S.O.S. October (2005)
This Malaise Is Our Grave (2006)
Discography (2009)

as Silence Is Suicide
Silence Is Suicide (2000)
Hope & The Anti-Culture (2014)

with 500$fine
Forward (1998)
95 Demo (2014)

Bibliography

Essays
An Index Of Around Me. First Second. January 14, 2014. .
Some Thoughts On Things. First. February 16, 2016. .

Fiction
A Fictional Tale Of Things. First Second. February 1, 2015. .

Children's
Keller. First Second. January 14, 2014. .

Art
Leave Nothing Of Value. First. June 12, 2011. .
Millions. First. August 2, 2012. .
A Call To Wild Birds. First. February 1, 2014. .

Articles
"Exchange—Mental Illness: Lighter and Darker"
"Mural Project's Aim Betrays Process of Art"
"Proposed Park Would Be Faux Public "
"Unhealed"
"They Want to Ride Their Bicycles, But How?"

References

1979 births
Living people
Musicians from Richmond, Virginia